Nahman Avigad  (Hebrew: נחמן אביגד, September 25, 1905 – January 28, 1992), born in Zawalow, Galicia (then Austria-Hungary, now Zavaliv, Ukraine), was an Israeli archaeologist.

Biography
Avigad studied architecture in what is now the town of Brno, Czech Republic. Avigad emigrated to Mandatory Palestine in 1926.  He married Shulamit (née Levin) Avigad in 1928. He worked in the excavations of the Beth Alpha synagogue and the Hamat Gader synagogue.

Avigad earned his PhD in 1952, with a dissertation on the tombs of the Kidron Valley, Jerusalem. He taught at Hebrew University from 1949 and until his retirement in 1974. 
 
He directed the dig at Beit She'arim beginning in 1953. Avigad also worked on the excavations of Masada, the mountaintop complex built by Herod the Great. He was involved in the exploration of caves in the Judean desert, and published one of the Dead Sea scrolls.

In 1969, Avigad was invited to undertake the excavation of the Jewish Quarter in the Old City of Jerusalem, devastated by the 1948 war and its aftermath. Among the finds were what was believed to be the earliest depiction of the menorah that once burned in the Second Temple, cut into a wall plastered 2,200 years ago, and the Burnt House, the remnant of a building destroyed when Titus, the future Roman Emperor, repressed the Jewish Revolt against Roman rule. This was the first physical or archaeological evidence for the destruction described in the work of Flavius Josephus. The dig also unearthed lavish villas belonging to the Herodian upper classes, remains of the Byzantine Nea (new) Church and Jerusalem's Cardo, a fifth-century -wide  road connecting the Church of the Holy Sepulcher and Nea Church. Among the most exciting finds was the remnants of the Broad Wall twice mentioned in the Book of Nehemiah. Nearby, Avigad also unearthed the Israelite Tower, a remnant of Jerusalem's Iron Age fortifications attesting to the Babylonian sack of Jerusalem in 586 BCE.

Avigad published on many topics, notably on Hebrew seals. One of the seals found by him in 1964 has been tentatively identified as belonging to Queen Jezebel, mentioned in the Bible: however, this identification is contested by others.
According to Bible scholar Frank Moore Cross, Avigad “was Israel’s most distinguished epigraphist in his generation, and one of the great figures in the history of Hebrew and Jewish epigraphy.”

Awards
 In 1954, Avigad was awarded the Bialik Prize for Jewish thought.
 In 1977, he was awarded the Israel Prize, for Land of Israel studies.
 In 1984, he received the Yakir Yerushalayim (Worthy Citizen of Jerusalem) award from the city of Jerusalem.

Bibliography
A complete bibliography and a biography can be found in the festschrift published in Avigad's honor: Eretz-Israel: Archaeological, Historical and  Geographical Studies.  Vol. 18, Nahman Avigad.  Eds. B. Mazar and Y. Yadin.  Jerusalem, The Israel Exploration Society and the Institute of Archaeology of the Hebrew University 1985.

Popular books
"Discovering Jerusalem" (1983)

See also 
List of Israel Prize recipients
List of Bialik Prize recipients

References

1905 births
1992 deaths
Israeli archaeologists
Biblical archaeologists
Polish emigrants to Mandatory Palestine
Jews from Galicia (Eastern Europe)
Austrian Jews
Jews in Mandatory Palestine
20th-century Israeli Jews
Israel Prize in archaeology recipients
Israel Prize in Land of Israel studies recipients
20th-century archaeologists